Smyrna, Arkansas may refer to:

Smyrna, Clark County, Arkansas
Smyrna, Pope County, Arkansas   
Smyrna Township, Pope County, Arkansas